"Come Tomorrow" is a song recorded by American singer Barbra Streisand for her 31st studio album, Guilty Pleasures (2005). The track was written by Ashley Gibb, Barry Gibb and Stephen Gibb while production was handled by Barry Gibb and John Merchant.

Commercially, "Come Tomorrow" entered the charts in Scotland and the United Kingdom and peaked at numbers 57 and 95, respectively.

Background 
"Come Tomorrow" was written by Ashley Gibb, Barry Gibb and Stephen Gibb while production was handled by Barry Gibb and John Merchant. The track includes backing vocals from singers Beth Cohen and Leesa Richards, in addition to featured artist Barry Gibbs, who backed for Streisand on each of the album's 12 songs.

Track listing

Charts

References 

2005 singles
2005 songs
Barbra Streisand songs
Columbia Records singles
Songs written by Barry Gibb